Inishmot is a civil parish in  County Meath, Ireland.

References

Civil parishes of County Meath